Penas Air was a regional airline service in Indonesia.

Destination
The airline served the following destinations :
 Jakarta - Soekarno-Hatta International Airport
 Ketapang - Ketapang Airport
 Sibolga - Ferdinand Lumban Tobing Airport
 Lubuklinggau - Silampari Airport

Fleet

References

http://penasair.wordpress.com/2011/01/20/hello-world/

Defunct airlines of Indonesia